Sylvie Becaert (born 6 September 1975 in Lille) is a French biathlete. Becaert's best year so far was 2003 when she came third in the overall world cup standings and won gold in the sprint event at the World Championships 2003 in Khanty-Mansiysk. At the 2006 Olympics in Turin, she won a bronze medal with the French relay team behind Russia and Germany.  In 2009 at the World Championships in Pyeongchang, Becaert was part of the victorious mixed relay team

Becaert retired after the 2009–10 season.

References

External links
 

1975 births
French female biathletes
Olympic biathletes of France
Olympic bronze medalists for France
Olympic silver medalists for France
Biathletes at the 2006 Winter Olympics
Biathletes at the 2002 Winter Olympics
Biathletes at the 2010 Winter Olympics
Living people
Olympic medalists in biathlon
Biathlon World Championships medalists
Medalists at the 2010 Winter Olympics
Medalists at the 2006 Winter Olympics
Université Savoie-Mont Blanc alumni
21st-century French women